Andranobolaha is a rural commune in the district of Toamasina II (district), in the region of Atsinanana, on the east coast of Madagascar.

Economy
The economy is based on agriculture. Rice is grown, other crops include coffee.

References

Populated places in Atsinanana